John "Jackie" Arthur (14 December 1917 – 19 November 1986) was an English footballer.

Playing career
Arthur began his career at Blackburn Rovers and Everton without making any league appearances, before playing for Stockport County shortly before the outbreak of the Second World War. During the war he returned to Everton and made guest appearances for Wrexham.

After the war Arthur spent almost a year at Chester before concluding his professional career with a long spell at Rochdale. After retiring from playing he remained on the training staff at Spotland.

References

1917 births
1986 deaths
People from Ramsbottom
English Football League players
English footballers
Association football wingers
Blackburn Rovers F.C. players
Everton F.C. players
Stockport County F.C. players
Chester City F.C. players
Rochdale A.F.C. players
Wrexham F.C. wartime guest players
Footballers from Greater Manchester